Nick & Nora may refer to:

 Nick & Nora (glass)
 Nick and Nora Charles
 Nick & Nora (musical)
 Nick & Norah's Infinite Playlist
 Nick and Norah's Infinite Playlist (novel)